This is a list of beaches in Singapore. Although Singapore is a nation composed of islands, the physical state and extent of its beaches today pales in comparison to their proliferation and quality two centuries ago. Rapid urbanisation and land use pressures necessitated the disappearance of most of these natural beaches as a result of land reclamation.

Today, most of the beaches still in existence are man-made, formed at the edges of newly reclaimed land, the longest being the one along the East Coast Park. There is currently (June 2009) plans for a further man-made beach in dedication to Jorge Toomer, Ian Curnow and Ben Smith, due to their efforts in sea turtle cultivation. One of the oldest naturally existing stretches of beach is at the northern end of Changi Beach.

On the main island 
Beach along East Coast Park
Beach along Sembawang Park
Beach along West Coast Park
Beach along Pasir Ris Park
Changi Beach Park
Punggol Beach (World War II massacre site)

On offshore islands

Sentosa
Palawan Beach
Siloso Beach
Tanjong Beach

Pulau Ubin
Beach on Pulau Ubin

Kusu Island
Beach on Kusu Island

See also
 List of beaches

References 

Beaches
Singapore
Beaches